Alejandro Abasolo Rodríguez (born 13 July 1997) is a former Mexican footballer who last played as a midfielder for Guadalupe F.C. on loan from Alebrijes de Oaxaca.

References

External links

Abasolo twitter

1997 births
Living people
Footballers from Mexico City
Association football midfielders
Alebrijes de Oaxaca players
Belén F.C. players
Guadalupe F.C. players
Liga FPD players
Mexican expatriate footballers
Mexican expatriate sportspeople in Costa Rica
Expatriate footballers in Costa Rica
Mexican footballers